"Lighters Up" is a song by American singer Snoop Lion featuring Mavado and Popcaan.  Was released on December 18, 2012 as the second single of his twelfth studio album Reincarnated, with the record labels Berhane Sound System, Vice Records, Mad Decent and RCA.

Music video 
The official video was released on February 1, 2013 in the singer account at VEVO platform. The music video was directed by Andy Capper.

Track listing 
Download digital
Lighters Up (featuring Mavado and Popcaan) — 3:46

Chart performance

References

2012 singles
2012 songs
RCA Records singles
Snoop Dogg songs
Songs written by Snoop Dogg
Song recordings produced by Ariel Rechtshaid
Songs written by Diplo
Songs written by Ariel Rechtshaid